"Here I Am" is a pop–dance song performed by the Swedish band Alcazar. The track had been appeared on the album Alcazarized, but was used in the promotion of the greatest hits compilation Dancefloor Deluxe, and was released just in time for Christmas 2004. The track failed to make a big impact on the charts, peaking at #40 in Sweden. However, in neighbouring Finland, it proved much more popular, climbing to #6 in the Finnish single charts.

The single contains French and Spanish versions of the track, as well as remixes from Groovetemplate, FL and Mark Jason among others.

Formats and track listings
These are the formats and track listings of promotional single releases of "Here I Am".

CD single
"Winter Version" - 4:52
"English Single Version" - 4:38
"Aquí Estoy" - 4:38
"Je Suis Là" - 4:38
"Groovetemplate Radio Mix" - 4:24
"Hard Act 2 Follow & Sharpshooter Club Mix" - 7:27
"FL's Dream Symphonic Remix" - 6:07
"Mark Jason's UK Sonar Club Anthem" - 6:12
"Piol's Dancing Snowflakes Remix" - 5:35
"Groovetemplate Extended Remix" - 5:55

Charts

References

Alcazar (band) songs
2004 singles
RCA Records singles
2003 songs